John Dubh Maclean or Ian Dubh Maclean may refer to:

John Dubh Maclean, 4th Clan Chief
John Dubh Maclean, 1st Laird of Morvern, founder of the Macleans of Kinlochaine, Drimnin, and Pennycross

See also
John Maclean (disambiguation)